The K-3 is an Armenian bullpup assault rifle chambered for 5.45×39mm ammunition with a selective fire system, selecting between semi-automatic mode, burst mode, and full automatic fire mode.  Little is known about the production and variants of these firearms, as its production is veiled in secrecy, but it is evident they are being used by the Armenian Special Forces, as was displayed in the 2006 military parade. A new variant of the K-3 was unveiled to the public nearly a decade after its initial debut.

Design
First unveiled in October 1996, the K-3 5.45 mm assault rifle is based on the Kalashnikov action, reconfigured into a bullpup layout. By October 1996, over 40 examples of the K-3 had been manufactured in Armenia, although series production had yet entered mass production.

Conceived by the Military Industrial Department of the Armenian Ministry of Defence, the K-3 has been produced in a basic iron-sight form, with the option of mounting a standard PSO-1 ×4 telescopic sight, also produced in Armenia.

K-3 is said to inherit all of the AK-74's advantages in terms of durability and firepower. Yet K-3 supersedes AK-74 in terms of minimisation of recoil, accuracy, ergonomics, balancing and mobility.

Due to the position of its ejection port, the K-3 can only be fired right-handed.

The muzzle of the barrel has an attachment that allows firing of rifle grenades. The new version of K-3 allows firing of grenades without the need for any separate attachments - the grenade can be fired by simply placing it on the barrel.  Most of the furniture is nylon-based hard plastic, as is the 30-round curved box magazine, based on that of the AK-74 rifle series.

References

External links
 Another video in Russian

5.45×39mm assault rifles
Bullpup rifles
Firearms of Armenia
Armenian inventions
Military equipment introduced in the 1990s